is a subway station on the Tokyo Metro Ginza Line in Taitō, Tokyo, Japan, operated by the Tokyo subway operator Tokyo Metro. It is numbered "G-17".

Lines

Station layout
The station has two side platforms located on the first basement (B1F) level, serving two tracks.

Platforms

There is no connection between the two platforms, and platform 1 (for Shibuya-bound trains) is accessed from the streel-level entrances 1 and 2 on the south side of Asakusa Dori, while platform 2 (for Asakusa-bound trains) is accessed from entrance 3 on the north side.

History
Inarichō Station opened on 30 December 1927.

The station facilities were inherited by Tokyo Metro after the privatization of the Teito Rapid Transit Authority (TRTA) in 2004.

Passenger statistics
In fiscal 2013, the station was the least used on the Ginza Line and the 127th busiest on the Tokyo Metro network with an average of 14,831 passengers daily.

The passenger statistics for previous years are as shown below.

See also
 List of railway stations in Japan

References

External links

 Tokyo Metro Inarichō Station information 

Railway stations in Tokyo
Tokyo Metro Ginza Line
Stations of Tokyo Metro
Railway stations in Japan opened in 1927